Arella Jácome Agnalt (born 20 August 2004) is an Ecuadorian footballer who plays as a midfielder for Superliga Femenina club L.D.U. Quito and the Ecuador women's national team.

Early life
The eldest of three children, Jácome was born to an Ecuadorian father, former Ecuador international footballer Santiago Jácome, and a Norwegian mother, Groanette Agnalt. She began playing football aged seven. At ten years old, she was enrolled in a football school run by LDU Quito, where father serves as sporting director.

Club career
In 2018, Jácome was signed to the L.D.U. Quito senior team by manager Jeny Herrera.

In March 2021, Jácome joined C.D. El Nacional on loan for the duration of the team's 2020 Copa Libertadores Femenina campaign in Argentina.

In February 2022, Jácome underwent surgery for a torn anterior cruciate ligament in her left leg.

References

2004 births
Living people
Ecuadorian women's footballers
Women's association football midfielders
Ecuador women's international footballers
21st-century Ecuadorian women
Footballers from Quito
Ecuadorian people of Norwegian descent